A curry puff is a snack of Maritime Southeast Asian origin. It is a small pie consisting of curry with chicken and potatoes in a deep-fried or baked pastry shell. The consistency of the curry is quite thick to prevent it from oozing out of the snack. The pap or puff reflects the Fujian Chinese dialect 泡 (pop), which means bubble, blister and puffed. It is a truly Southeast Asian snack as it has Indian, Chinese or Malay elements.

Although the origins of this snack are uncertain, the snack is believed to have originated in Maritime Southeast Asia due in part to the various influences of the British Cornish pasty, the Portuguese empanada  and the Indian samosa during the colonial era. The curry puff is one of several "puff" type pastries with different fillings, though now it is by far the most common. Other common varieties include eggs, sardines, root vegetables and onions, or sweet fillings such as yam.

Various kinds of curry puff are enjoyed throughout Southeast Asia and India.

Indonesia

In Indonesia, a curry puff is known as a pastel, although pastels do not necessarily contain any curry powder.

Malaysia
In Malaysia, curry puffs are commonly known as  karipap and sold freshly fried at many Malay, Chinese and Indian food stalls and even at trendy cafes.

Another Malay version of this snack is known as epok-epok and teh-teh which is smaller than the curry puff. The curry puffs from Indian bakeries differ from epok-epok in the use of 'layered' pastry that creates a flaky crust. Other varieties of the epok-epok are filled with half a boiled egg instead of chicken. Another alternative is tinned sardines. There are also vegetarian curry puffs that are in fact not spicy and made from shredded radish, tofu, potatoes and grated carrots. They are often eaten with sweet chili sauce.

Manufacturers have developed a version of the curry puff that can be frozen and later reheated by the consumer. These are suitable for the export market and can be produced in volume for shipment to various regions, such as the Middle East, where there is demand. In addition, new fillings have been experimented with, including tuna and black pepper.

India

In Indian food bakeries  it is quite common to find vegetarian curry puffs with vegetables like potatoes, carrots and onions as fillings. Egg puffs and chicken puffs are also other variants available in Indian bakeries.

Myanmar (Burma)
The curry puff is a common snack sold in Chinatowns and tea shops throughout Myanmar, where is it known as be tha mont. The traditional filling is duck meat and potato spiced with garam masala, onions, powdered chili peppers, garlic, and ginger.

Singapore
Curry puffs are commonly seen in pasar malams, bakeries and food stalls in shopping centres. Additionally, the aforementioned epok-epok is a popular variation in some of Singapore's hawker centres, usually amongst Malay stalls. Alternatively, the more common type of curry puff has a thick or flaky English-style crust, with a mixture of Chinese and Indian styles in the filling.

They may also be categorised into hand-made or mass-produced machine-made puffs in triangular shape or half wrapped circular shape. Both variations are popular in Singapore, although some might argue that the former is typically more delicious. Curry puff variations are usually denoted in coloured dye markings on the side of the puffs.

Other puff snacks modelled on the curry puff concept have also been introduced, for example puffs with yam, durian, corn, red bean, nata de coco, grass jelly, bird's nest and even custard fillings.

Besides the more "exotic" fillings mentioned, there are also more conventional flavours which are quite popular with the locals. These puffs are readily available in Singapore, which include sardine, black-pepper chicken and tuna fillings.

In Singapore, Old Chang Kee has been selling curry puffs for over 60 years and now has outlets all over Singapore, Malaysia, Indonesia, Australia and UK.

Thailand

In Thailand, a curry puff is known as a karipap (กะหรี่ปั๊บ). Assumed to have been adapted from Portuguese cuisine pastel, it arrived in Thailand since the Ayutthaya period in the reign of King Narai (1633–1688) by Portuguese-Japanese-Bengali lady Maria Guyomar de Pinha like many kinds of Thai desserts such as thong yip, thong yot, foi thong and luk chup. Notable areas where karipap is popular are Amphoe Muak Lek, and Saraburi province in central Thailand, where durian filling is used.

Ingredients
 Curry powder
 Potatoes
 A small piece of hard-boiled egg
 Meat, usually beef or chicken
 Onions
 Puff pastry
 Cream cheese, used mainly in Americanized variations of the food
 Sardines

See also

 Curry beef turnover, Chinese pastry
 Puff pastry
 List of stuffed dishes
 Pasty
 Curry bread

References

Southeast Asian curries
Bruneian cuisine
Indonesian snack foods
Malaysian cuisine
Indian snack foods
Malay cuisine
Savoury pies
Singaporean cuisine
Thai desserts and snacks
Stuffed dishes
Burmese desserts and snacks
Deep fried foods